Nephopterix fuscalis is a species of snout moth in the genus Nephopterix. It was described by George Hamilton Kenrick in 1907. It is found in New Guinea.

References

Moths described in 1907
Phycitini